Hawaii was an American heavy metal band formed in 1981 by former Deuce guitarist Marty Friedman, originally called Vixen (not to be confused with the 1980s female band of the same name). Vixen recorded several demos and appeared on the U.S. Metal Vol. II (1982) compilation album, before releasing the Made In Hawaii EP in 1983.  Another early recording appeared on Metal Massacre II (1982) under the name Aloha, with Lisa Ruiz taking over lead vocals from Kim La Chance.

After Hawaii split up, Marty Friedman formed the band Cacophony with Jason Becker; bassist/vocalist Gary St. Pierre joined Vicious Rumors as lead vocalist on their 1985 debut album Soldiers of the Night.

Vixen vocalist Kim La Chance surfaced with Malisha and Serve Your Savage Beast in 1986.  She was also the executive producer behind the Vixen – The Works (2003) demo compilation CD release, including "Angels from the Dust" from Shrapnel Records' U.S. Metal Vol. II.

Band members 
 Eddie Day – vocals
 Gary St. Pierre – bass, vocals on One Nation Underground
 Marty Friedman – lead guitar
 Tom Azevedo – rhythm guitar
 Joey Galisa – bass
 Jeff Graves – drums
 Bob Shade- drums/ backing vocals
 Kim La Chance – vocals on Made In Hawaii
 Kimo – bass on Made In Hawaii

Discography
 Made In Hawaii (EP) (as Vixen) (1983)
 One Nation Underground (1983)
 Loud, Wild and Heavy (EP) (1984)
 The Natives Are Restless (1985)
 The Works (as Vixen) (2003)

References 

Musical groups established in 1982
Musical groups disestablished in 1985
Heavy metal musical groups from Hawaii
American speed metal musical groups
Musical quintets
1982 establishments in Hawaii
Shrapnel Records artists